Uncle Luke is the fifth album released by American rapper Luke. It was released on May 14, 1996, on Luther Campbell Music and was mainly produced by Darren "DJ Spin" Rudnick, and Rod XL, with additional production by Frankie Cutlass, Ice Cube and Doug E. Fresh. Uncle Luke was a success, peaking at #51 on the Billboard 200 and #8 on the Top R&B/Hip-Hop Albums and spawned a single, "Scarred", which made it to #64 on the Billboard Hot 100 and #7 on the Hot Rap Singles, the song was also turned into a Video.

Uncle Luke was joint-distributed through Alliance Entertainment Corporation and the Island Black Music division of Island Records (though they weren't directly mentioned in name) and is the first and only Luke solo album released under the temporary new umbrella name, Luther Campbell Music after Luke Records went into bankruptcy, sold its catalog to Joseph "Lil' Joe" Weinberger (ultimately forming Lil' Joe Records) and went under reconstruction.  The Luke Records name was almost instantly reinstated months later.

Track listing
"Intro"- 1:46  
"Scarred"- 3:27  (featuring  Verb & Trick Daddy)  Produced by: Darren "DJ Spin" Rudnick
"The Interview"- :31  
"Bust a Nut"- 4:29 (featuring The Notorious B.I.G.) Produced By Frankie Cutlass
"Dick in Ya Mouth"- :29  
"Bounce to da Beat"- 3:24  Produced by: Darren "DJ Spin" Rudnick
"Never Forget from Whence You Came"- 4:46  
"Freaks on the Radio"- :41  
"Freaky Bitches"- 4:36 
"Luke Megamix"- 3:12  
"Interview, Pt. 2"- :19  
"Asshole Naked"- 4:56 (featuring Ice Cube) 
"Marvin's Comedy Show"- 1:00  
"Do-It Do-It"- 3:33  
"In the News"- :51  
"Work It Baby"- 3:35  Produced by: Darren "DJ Spin" Rudnick
"To Have a Dick"- :30  
"Bone"- 4:59  
"T.K. The Pussyologist"- 1:39  
"R U Ready"- 4:45  
"Ol' G"- 4:10  
"911"- 1:33  
"Off da Hook"- 4:44 (featuring Doug E. Fresh) 
"Out da Closet"- 1:15  
"Straight Beef"- 4:06  
"Shout Outs"- 4:51 

1996 albums
Luther Campbell albums
Luke Records albums